The Methodist Episcopal Church  in Scotland, South Dakota is a former Methodist church located at  811 6th Street.  It was built in 1872.  In 1979 it was added to the National Register of Historic Places. As of that date, it was the Heritage Museum-Chapel.

It is a one-and-one-half-story building made of native chalkstone quarried one-half mile away.

It is the oldest Methodist Church building in South Dakota.  The national Methodist Church lists it as their historic site No. 52.

References

External links

 1888 directory of members and probationeers of the Methodist Episcopal Church in Scotland, South Dakota

Churches on the National Register of Historic Places in South Dakota
Methodist churches in South Dakota
Churches in Bon Homme County, South Dakota
National Register of Historic Places in Bon Homme County, South Dakota
Scotland, South Dakota